Alex Finlayson is an American playwright whose sly irreverent plays found more success on the English stage than in the United States.  After winning Finlayson  a Mobil Oil International Playwriting Prize, Winding the Ball was produced by The Royal Exchange Theatre, Manchester, which also commissioned and produced Finlayson's Misfits (1996) and Tobaccoland (1999).  All three plays starred American stage and film actress Lisa Eichhorn and were directed by Greg Hersov.

Hersov has written that Finlayson creates "vivid and authentic worlds underpinned by a fiercely personal moral vision.  She deals with the most private sides of our lives but sees them in terms of the history and culture of her country." Reviewing Tobaccoland, Stephen Gallagher says that Finlayson “fuses the epic and the intimate to deliver a play that should propel her into that category of American dramatists once dominated by Arthur Miller and Tennessee Williams.”   Finlayson's play Winding the Ball was praised for being "gripping, luridly funny"  and  "splendidly assured, with wit and perception that bespeak a major talent. Even [its] symbolism-- that Achilles heel of much American drama- packs a powerful punch." It won actor David Schofield a Best Actor award from the Manchester Evening News.

Finlayson's most controversial play is Misfits, inspired by Arthur Miller's autobiography, Timebends. Finlayson was intrigued by Miller's account of the 1961 film The Misfits as a "valentine" for his wife Marilyn Monroe.   Her play Misfits portrays the film's historic box office and artistic failure as the casual fault of screenwriter Miller, director John Huston, and producer Frank Taylor, and not its star, Marilyn Monroe, who is most often blamed for the film disaster.  Misfits received mixed reviews, with some critics attacking Finlayson for daring to put Miller onstage as a character.  However, The Times proclaimed the play "riveting" and "inventive." Perhaps not surprising, given Miller's stature, U.S. theaters steered clear of Misfits.  But in a dramatic twist worthy of the stage, Arthur Miller may have had the final word.  His last play, Finishing the Picture (Goodman Theatre, Chicago 2004),  presented his version of Marilyn Monroe and the making of The Misfits (film) eleven years after Finlayson’s Misfits debuted.

Alex Finlayson was born and grew up in East Texas the daughter of an actor.  After a brief career as a New York advertising copywriter, she taught herself to write plays by moving to a remote cabin in the Appalachian Mountains and studying the work of playwrights she admired.  Finlayson was an early protege of Julia Miles and the Women's Project.  Her first play, Ladies' Side, was produced by the Source Theatre, Washington D.C. and received a Helen Hayes nomination for Best New Play.  Another early play World of Beauty won the Texas Playwrights Festival (1988)at Stages Repertory Theatre, Houston while Ted Swindley was Artistic Director.

References

External links
 Triangle Regional Playwrights:  A Brief History by Byron Woods
 Misfits explores Myth of Marilyn Monroe in Courageous Fashion, Style Weekly
 Don't Mess with Arthur Miller, Chicago Reader
 Misfits review, Financial Times
 Tobaccoland review, The Guardian
 Stages Revives Texas Salon Comedy, Houston Chronicle
 Helen Hayes Awards
 North Carolina Artists Grant Award
 No Shushing in This Library, San Diego Reader
 I Was A High School Teacher Dropout,San Diego Reader
 I'm King of This Alley,San Diego Reader

1951 births
Living people
People from Tyler, Texas
Wellesley College alumni
20th-century American dramatists and playwrights